  
Wyville is a village in the civil parish of Wyville cum Hungerton, in the South Kesteven district of Lincolnshire, England, and situated approximately  south-west from Grantham The whole parish covers about . The population is included in the civil parish of Little Ponton and Stroxton.

The village is an ecclesiastical parish of the Harlaxton Group of the Grantham Deanery in the Diocese of Lincoln. The incumbent is Rev Keith Hanson.

Wyville

Wyville is a small hamlet consisting mainly of a collection of farm buildings and a 19th-century church.

A small spring runs to the south of the hamlet, toward the Cringle Stream at Stoke Rochford, an early tributary of the River Witham.

Hungerton

Hungerton is a small hamlet set about a half mile northwest of Wyville. Hungerton has been the population centre of the parish in recent centuries.

History
Both villages are listed in the Domesday Book, and at the time of the survey were larger than today.
St Catherine has long been associated with Wyville. Ancient stone coffins have been found on what may have been the site of the original church. The present church was built in 1858.

In 1848 Samuel Lewis described the parish as:
"WYVILL, a parish, in the union of Grantham, wapentake of Loveden, parts of Kesteven, county of Lincoln, 6 miles (N. W.) from Colsterworth; containing, with Hungerton, 137 inhabitants. The living is a discharged rectory, with that of Hungerton united; net income, £35; patron, the Bishop of Lincoln. The church is in ruins, and the inhabitants attend that at Harlaxton."
A few years later John Marius Wilson said of the parish:
"WYVILLE-WITH-HUNGERTON, a parish in Grantham district, Lincoln; 3½ miles W by S of Great Ponton r. station, and 5 SSW of Grantham. Post town, Colsterworth, under Grantham. Acres, 1,670. Real property, £1,840. Pop., 155. Houses, 28. The living is a double rectory in the diocese of Lincoln. Value, £35. Patron, the Bishop of L. The church was built in 1858."

References

External links

"Wyville (Wyville with Hungerton, or Hungerton cum Wyville)", Genuki.org.uk

 

Villages in Lincolnshire
South Kesteven District